Princessa is a house music rapper/singer from New York City. She was the featured artist on two singles by the Austrian house music band, Bingoboys: the first was the song "How to Dance", which hit number one on the U.S. Dance chart in 1991, as well as number 25 on the Billboard Hot 100; the second was a follow-up single, "Borrowed Love", which peaked at number 32 on the dance chart the same year. She also did a guest appearance on Chic's 1992 number-one club hit "Chic Mystique". She worked with Vanilla Ice on a number of songs as a backup singer from 1987 to 1991.

Singles

See also
List of artists who reached number one on the US Dance chart

References

21st-century African-American women singers
American dance musicians
American house musicians
Living people
Year of birth missing (living people)
American women in electronic music